, writing under the pseudonym , was a Japanese film producer and the third president of Tsuburaya Productions.

Tsuburaya Productions 
After the sudden death of his brother Hajime, in 1973, Noboru became president of Tsuburaya Productions until 1994.

Filmography

Producer 

 Ultraman, Ultraseven: Great Violent Monster Fight (1969) 
 The 6 Ultra Brothers vs. the Monster Army (1974)
 The Last Dinosaur (1977)
 Ultraman (1979)
 Ultraman: Great Monster Decisive Battle (1979)
 Ultraman Kids: M7.8 Sei no Yukai na Nakama (1984)
 Ultraman Zoffy: Ultra Warriors vs. the Giant Monster Army (1984)
 Ultraman Story (1984)
 Anime Chan (1984)
 Ultraman: The Adventure Begins (1987)
 Ultraman G (1990)
 Skyscraper Hunting (1991)
 Shōrishatachi (1992)
 Ultraman vs. Kamen Rider (1993)
 Superhuman Samurai Syber-Squad (1994)

References

External links 

 

1935 births
1995 deaths
Japanese film producers
Tsuburaya Productions
Ultra Series